El Rashid El Tahir Bakr (24 June 1933 – 11 March 1988) was born in the Karkoj Blue Nile region of Sudan. In 1958 he graduated from the Khartoum University Law Faculty. He was Vice President of Sudan and Prime Minister of Sudan from 11 August 1976 until 10 September 1977. 
He was the chairman of the legislature from 1974 to 1977 and from 1980 to 1981. He was Foreign Minister of Sudan from 1977 to 1980.

He was a member of the Sudan Socialist Union.

References 

1933 births
1988 deaths
Vice presidents of Sudan
Prime Ministers of Sudan
Foreign ministers of Sudan
Sudanese Socialist Union politicians
Speakers of the National Assembly (Sudan)
University of Khartoum alumni